The fourteenth season of the American comedy television series It's Always Sunny in Philadelphia premiered on FXX on September 25, 2019. The season consists of 10 episodes and concluded on November 20, 2019.

Cast

Main cast
 Charlie Day as Charlie Kelly
 Glenn Howerton as Dennis Reynolds
 Rob McElhenney as Mac
 Kaitlin Olson as Dee Reynolds
 Danny DeVito as Frank Reynolds

Recurring cast
 Mary Elizabeth Ellis as The Waitress
 David Hornsby as Cricket
 Chad L. Coleman as Z
 Michael Naughton as The Waiter
 Jessica Collins as Jackie Denardo

Guest stars
 Dolph Lundgren as Thundergun

Production
On April 1, 2016, the series was renewed for a thirteenth and fourteenth season, which tied it with The Adventures of Ozzie and Harriet as the longest-running (in number of seasons) live-action sitcom in American television history. Filming for the season began on June 13, 2019. Glenn Howerton made his directorial debut, directing the first two produced episodes of the season.

Episodes

Reception
The fourteenth season received positive reviews. On Rotten Tomatoes, it has an approval rating of 83% with an average score of 7.6/10 based on 12 reviews. The website's critical consensus is, "Always Sunnys provocative humor has lost some bite, but the patrons of Paddy's Pub ought to be pleased by the Gang's inability to cope with modernity – and each other.

References

External links
 
 

It's Always Sunny in Philadelphia
2019 American television seasons